

Events

Pre-1600
 421 – Italian city Venice is founded with the dedication of the first church, that of San Giacomo di Rialto on the islet of Rialto.
 708 – Pope Constantine becomes the 88th pope. He would be the last pope to visit Constantinople until 1967.
 717 – Theodosius III resigns the throne to the Byzantine Empire to enter the clergy.
 919 – Romanos Lekapenos seizes the Boukoleon Palace in Constantinople and becomes regent of the Byzantine emperor Constantine VII.
1000 – Fatimid caliph al-Hakim bi-Amr Allah assassinates the eunuch chief minister Barjawan and assumes control of the government.
1306 – Robert the Bruce becomes King of Scots (Scotland).
1409 – The Council of Pisa convenes, in an attempt to heal the Western Schism.
1519 – Hernando Cortes, entering province of Tabasco, defeats Tabascan Indians. 
1576 – Jerome Savage takes out a sub-lease to start the Newington Butts Theatre outside London. 
1584 – Sir Walter Raleigh is granted a patent to colonize Virginia.

1601–1900
1655 – Saturn's largest moon, Titan, is discovered by Christiaan Huygens.
1708 – A French fleet anchors nears Fife Ness as part of the planned French invasion of Britain.
1770 – Daskalogiannis, leads the people of Sfakia in the first Greek uprising against the Ottoman rule 
1802 – The Treaty of Amiens is signed as a "Definitive Treaty of Peace" between France and the United Kingdom.
  1807   – The Swansea and Mumbles Railway, then known as the Oystermouth Railway, becomes the first passenger-carrying railway in the world.
1811 – Percy Bysshe Shelley is expelled from the University of Oxford for publishing the pamphlet The Necessity of Atheism.
1821 – Greek War of Independence - Traditional date of the start of the Greek War of Independence. The war had actually begun on 23 February 1821 (Julian calendar).
1845 – New Zealand Legislative Council pass the first Militia Act constituting the New Zealand Army.
1865 – American Civil War: In Virginia, Confederate forces temporarily capture Fort Stedman from the Union.
1894 – Coxey's Army, the first significant American protest march, departs Massillon, Ohio for Washington, D.C.

1901–present
1905 – The Greek football club P.A.E. G.S. Diagoras is founded in the city of Rhodes.
1911 – In New York City, the Triangle Shirtwaist Factory fire kills 146 garment workers.
  1911   – Andrey Yushchinsky is murdered in Kiev, leading to the Beilis affair.
1914 – The Greek multi-sport club Aris Thessaloniki is founded in Thessaloniki.
1917 – The Georgian Orthodox Church restores its autocephaly abolished by Imperial Russia in 1811.
1918 – The Belarusian People's Republic is established.
1919 – The Tetiev pogrom occurs in Ukraine, becoming the prototype of mass murder during the Holocaust.
1924 – On the anniversary of Greek Independence, Alexandros Papanastasiou proclaims the Second Hellenic Republic.
1931 – The Scottsboro Boys are arrested in Alabama and charged with rape.
1932 – The famous Tomb of the Unknown Soldier is unveiled in Athens.
1941 – The Kingdom of Yugoslavia joins the Axis powers with the signing of the Tripartite Pact.
1947 – An explosion in a coal mine in Centralia, Illinois kills 111.
1948 – The first successful tornado forecast predicts that a tornado will strike Tinker Air Force Base, Oklahoma.
1949 – More than 92,000 kulaks are suddenly deported from the Baltic states to Siberia.
1957 – United States Customs seizes copies of Allen Ginsberg's poem "Howl" on obscenity grounds.
  1957   – The European Economic Community is established with West Germany, France, Italy, Belgium, Netherlands and Luxembourg as the first members.
1959 – Chain Island is sold by the State of California to Russell Gallaway III, a Sacramento businessman who plans to use it as a "hunting and fishing retreat", for $5,258.20 ($ in ).
1965 – Civil rights activists led by Martin Luther King Jr. successfully complete their 4-day 50-mile march from Selma to the capitol in Montgomery, Alabama.
1971 – The Army of the Republic of Vietnam abandon an attempt to cut off the Ho Chi Minh trail in Laos.
1975 – Faisal of Saudi Arabia is shot and killed by his nephew.
1979 – The first fully functional Space Shuttle orbiter, Columbia, is delivered to the John F. Kennedy Space Center to be prepared for its first launch.
1988 – The Candle demonstration in Bratislava is the first mass demonstration of the 1980s against the communist regime in Czechoslovakia.
1995 – WikiWikiWeb, the world's first wiki, and part of the Portland Pattern Repository, is made public by Ward Cunningham.
1996 – The European Union's Veterinarian Committee bans the export of British beef and its by-products as a result of mad cow disease (Bovine spongiform encephalopathy).
2006 – Capitol Hill massacre: A gunman kills six people before taking his own life at a party in Seattle's Capitol Hill neighborhood.
  2006   – Protesters demanding a new election in Belarus, following the rigged 2006 Belarusian presidential election, clash with riot police. Opposition leader Aleksander Kozulin is among several protesters arrested.
2018 – Syrian civil war: Following the completion of the Afrin offensive, the Syrian Democratic Forces (SDF) initiate an insurgency against the Turkish occupation of the Afrin District.

Births

Pre-1600
1252 – Conradin, Duke of Swabia (d. 1268)
1259 – Andronikos II Palaiologos, Byzantine emperor (d. 1332)
1297 – Andronikos III Palaiologos, Byzantine emperor (d. 1341)
  1297   – Arnošt of Pardubice, the first Bohemian archbishop (d. 1364)
1345 – Blanche of Lancaster (d. 1369)
1347 – Catherine of Siena, Italian philosopher, theologian, and saint (d. 1380)
1404 – John Beaufort, 1st Duke of Somerset, English military leader (d. 1444)
1414 – Thomas Clifford, 8th Baron de Clifford, English noble (d. 1455)
1434 – Eustochia Smeralda Calafato, Italian saint (d. 1485)
1479 – Vasili III of Russia (d. 1533)
1491 – Marie d'Albret, Countess of Rethel (d. 1549)
1510 – Guillaume Postel, French linguist (d. 1581)
1538 – Christopher Clavius, German mathematician and astronomer (d. 1612)
1541 – Francesco I de' Medici, Grand Duke of Tuscany (d. 1587)
1545 – John II, Duke of Schleswig-Holstein-Sonderburg (d. 1622)
1546 – Giacomo Castelvetro, Italian writer (d. 1616)
1593 – Jean de Brébeuf, French-Canadian missionary and saint (d. 1649)

1601–1900
1611 – Evliya Çelebi, Ottoman Turk traveller and writer (d. 1682)
1636 – Henric Piccardt, Dutch lawyer (d. 1712)
1643 – Louis Moréri, French priest and scholar (d. 1680)
1661 – Paul de Rapin, French soldier and historian (d. 1725)
1699 – Johann Adolph Hasse, German singer and composer (d. 1783)
1741 – Jean-Antoine Houdon, French sculptor and educator (d. 1828)
1745 – John Barry, American naval officer and father of the American navy (d. 1803)
1767 – Joachim Murat, French general (d. 1815)
1782 – Caroline Bonaparte, French daughter of Carlo Buonaparte (d. 1839)
1800 – Ernst Heinrich Karl von Dechen, German geologist and academic (d. 1889)
1808 – José de Espronceda, Spanish poet and author (d. 1842)
1824 – Clinton L. Merriam, American banker and politician (d. 1900)
1840 – Myles Keogh, Irish-American colonel (d. 1876)
1863 – Simon Flexner, American physician and academic (d. 1946)
1867 – Gutzon Borglum, American sculptor, designed Mount Rushmore (d. 1941)
  1867   – Arturo Toscanini, Italian-American cellist and conductor (d. 1957)
1868 – Bill Lockwood, English cricketer (d. 1932)
1871 – Louis Perrée, French fencer (d. 1924)
1872 – Horatio Nelson Jackson, American race car driver and physician (d. 1955)
1873 – Rudolf Rocker, German-American author and activist (d. 1958)
1874 – Selim Sırrı Tarcan, Turkish educator and politician (d. 1957)
1876 – Irving Baxter, American high jumper and pole vaulter (d. 1957)
1877 – Walter Little, Canadian politician (d. 1961)
1878 – František Janda-Suk, Czech discus thrower and shot putter (d. 1955)
1879 – Amedee Reyburn, American swimmer and water polo player (d. 1920)
1881 – Béla Bartók, Hungarian pianist and composer (d. 1945)
  1881   – Patrick Henry Bruce, American painter and educator (d. 1936)
  1881   – Mary Webb, English author and poet (d. 1927)
1893 – Johannes Villemson, Estonian runner (d. 1971)
1895 – Siegfried Handloser, German general and physician (d. 1954)
  1885   – Jimmy Seed, English international footballer and manager (d. 1966)
1897 – Leslie Averill, New Zealand doctor and soldier (d. 1981)
1899 – François Rozet, French-Canadian actor (d. 1994)

1901–present
1901 – Ed Begley, American actor (d. 1970)
1903 – Binnie Barnes, English-American actress (d. 1998)
  1903   – Frankie Carle, American pianist and bandleader (d. 2001)
  1903   – Nahum Norbert Glatzer, Ukrainian-American theologian and scholar (d. 1990)
1904 – Pete Johnson, American boogie-woogie and jazz pianist (d. 1967)
1905 – Albrecht Mertz von Quirnheim, German colonel (d. 1944)
1906 – Jean Sablon, French singer and actor (d. 1994)
  1906   – A. J. P. Taylor, English historian and academic (d. 1990)
1908 – David Lean, English director, producer, and screenwriter (d. 1991)
1910 – Magda Olivero, Italian soprano (d. 2014)
  1910   – Benzion Netanyahu, Polish-Israeli historian and academic (d. 2012)
1912 – Melita Norwood, English civil servant and spy (d. 2005)
  1912   – Jean Vilar, French actor and director (d. 1971)
1913 – Reo Stakis, Cypriot-Scottish businessman, founded Stakis Hotels (d. 2001)
1914 – Norman Borlaug, American agronomist and humanitarian, Nobel Prize laureate (d. 2009)
  1914   – Tassos, Greek engraver, etcher and sculptor (d. 1985) 
1915 – Dorothy Squires, Welsh singer (d. 1998)
1916 – S. M. Pandit, Indian painter and educator (d. 1993)
1918 – Howard Cosell, American soldier, journalist, and author (d. 1995)
1920 – Paul Scott, English author, poet, and playwright (d. 1978)
  1920   – Patrick Troughton, English actor (d. 1987)
  1920   – Usha Mehta, Gandhian and freedom fighter of India (d. 2000) 
1921 – Nancy Kelly, American actress (d. 1995)
  1921   – Simone Signoret, French actress (d. 1985)
  1921   – Alexandra of Yugoslavia, the last Queen of Yugoslavia (d. 1993)
1922 – Eileen Ford, American businesswoman, co-founded Ford Models (d. 2014)
1923 – Bonnie Guitar, American singer-songwriter and guitarist (d. 2019)
  1923   – Wim van Est, Dutch cyclist (d. 2003)
1924 – Roberts Blossom, American actor (d. 2011)
  1924   – Machiko Kyō, Japanese actress (d. 2019)
1925 – Flannery O'Connor, American short story writer and novelist (d. 1964)
  1925   – Anthony Quinton, Baron Quinton, English physician and philosopher (d. 2010)
  1925   – Kishori Sinha, Indian politician, social activist and advocate (d. 2016)
1926 – Riz Ortolani, Italian composer and conductor (d. 2014)
  1926   – László Papp, Hungarian boxer (d. 2003)
  1926   – Shirley Jean Rickert, American actress (d. 2009)
  1926   – Jaime Sabines, Mexican poet and politician (d. 1999)
  1926   – Gene Shalit, American journalist and critic
1927 – P. Shanmugam, Indian politician, 13th Chief Minister of Puducherry (d. 2013)
1928 – Jim Lovell, American captain, pilot, and astronaut
  1928   – Gunnar Nielsen, Danish runner and typographer (d. 1985)
  1928   – Peter O'Brien, Australian rugby league player (d. 2016)
  1928   – Hans Steinbrenner, German sculptor (d. 2008)
1929 – Cecil Taylor, American pianist and composer (d. 2018)
1930 – David Burge, American pianist, composer, and conductor (d. 2013)
  1930   – Carlo Mauri, Italian mountaineer and explorer (d. 1982)
  1930   – Rudy Minarcin, American baseball player and coach (d. 2013)
1931 – Humphrey Burton, English radio and television host
1932 – Penelope Gilliatt, English novelist, short story writer, and critic (d. 1993)
  1932   – Wes Santee, American runner (d. 2010)
1934 – Johnny Burnette, American singer-songwriter (d. 1964)
  1934   – Bernard King, Australian actor and chef (d. 2002)
  1934   – Karlheinz Schreiber, German-Canadian businessman
  1934   – Gloria Steinem, American feminist activist, co-founded the Women's Media Center
1935 – Gabriel Elorde, Filipino boxer (d. 1985)
1936 – Carl Kaufmann, American-German sprinter (d. 2008)
1937 – Tom Monaghan, American businessman, founded Domino's Pizza
1938 – Hoyt Axton, American singer-songwriter and actor (d. 1999)
  1938   – Daniel Buren, French sculptor and painter
  1938   – Fritz d'Orey, Brazilian racing driver (d. 2020)
1939 – Toni Cade Bambara, American author, academic, and activist (d. 1995)
  1939   – D. C. Fontana, American screenwriter and producer (d. 2019)
1941 – Gudmund Hernes, Norwegian sociologist and politician, Norwegian Minister of Education and Research
1942 – Aretha Franklin, American singer-songwriter and pianist (d. 2018)
  1942   – Richard O'Brien, English actor and screenwriter
  1942   – Kim Woodburn, English television host
1943 – Paul Michael Glaser, American actor and director
1945 – Leila Diniz, Brazilian actress (d. 1972)
1946 – Cliff Balsom, English footballer
  1946   – Daniel Bensaïd, French philosopher and author (d. 2010)
  1946   – Stephen Hunter, American author and critic
  1946   – Maurice Krafft, French volcanologist (d. 1991)
1947 – Richard Cork, English historian and critic
  1947   – Elton John, English singer-songwriter, pianist, producer, and actor
1948 – Bonnie Bedelia, American actress
  1948   – Michael Stanley, American singer-songwriter and guitarist (d. 2021)
1949 – Ronnie Flanagan, Northern Irish Chief Constable (Royal Irish Constabulary, Police Service of Northern Ireland) 
  1949   – Sue Klebold, American activist
1950 – Chuck Greenberg, American saxophonist, songwriter, and producer (d. 1995)
  1950   – Ronnie McDowell, American singer-songwriter 
  1950   – David Paquette, American-New Zealander pianist
1951 – Jumbo Tsuruta, Japanese wrestler (d. 2000)
1952 – Stephen Dorrell, English soldier and politician, Secretary of State for Health
  1952   – Antanas Mockus, Colombian mathematician, philosopher, and politician, Mayor of Bogotá
1953 – Christos Ardizoglou, Greek footballer 
  1953   – Robert Fox, English producer and manager
  1953   – Vesna Pusić, Croatian sociologist and politician, Deputy Prime Minister of Croatia
  1953   – Haroon Rasheed, Pakistani cricketer and coach 
1954 – Thom Loverro, American journalist and author
1955 – Daniel Boulud, French chef and author
  1955   – Lee Mazzilli, American baseball player, coach, and manager
1957 – Christina Boxer, English runner and journalist
  1957   – Kanellos Kanellopoulos, Greek cyclist 
  1957   – Jonathan Michie, English economist and academic
  1957   – Aleksandr Puchkov, Russian hurdler
  1957   – Jim Uhls, American screenwriter and producer
1958 – Susie Bright, American journalist, author, and critic
  1958   – Lorna Brown, Canadian artist, curator, and writer
  1958   – Sisy Chen, Taiwanese journalist and politician
  1958   – María Caridad Colón, Cuban javelin thrower and shot putter
  1958   – John Ensign, American physician and politician
  1958   – Ray Tanner, American baseball player and coach
  1958   – Åsa Torstensson, Swedish politician, 3rd Swedish Minister for Infrastructure
1960 – Steve Norman, English saxophonist, songwriter, and producer
  1960   – Peter O'Brien, Australian actor
  1960   – Brenda Strong, American actress
1961 – Mark Brooks, American golfer
1962 – Marcia Cross, American actress
  1962   – David Nuttall, English lawyer and politician
1963 – Karen Bruce, English dancer and choreographer
  1963   – Velle Kadalipp, Estonian architect
  1963   – Andrew O'Connor, British actor, comedian, magician, television presenter and executive producer
1964 – René Meulensteen, Dutch footballer and coach
  1964   – Ken Wregget, Canadian ice hockey player
  1964   – Norm Duke, American bowler
1965 – Avery Johnson, American basketball player and coach
  1965   – Stefka Kostadinova, Bulgarian high jumper
  1965   – Sarah Jessica Parker, American actress, producer, and designer
1966 – Tom Glavine, American baseball player
  1966   – Humberto Gonzalez, Mexican boxer
  1966   – Jeff Healey, Canadian singer-songwriter and guitarist (d. 2008)
  1966   – Anton Rogan, Northern Irish footballer
1967 – Matthew Barney, American sculptor and photographer
  1967   – Doug Stanhope, American comedian and actor
  1967   – Debi Thomas, American figure skater and physician
1969 – George Chlitsios, Greek conductor and composer
  1969   – Dale Davis, American basketball player
  1969   – Cathy Dennis, English singer-songwriter, record producer and actress
  1969   – Jeffrey Walker, English singer-songwriter and bass player 
1970 – Magnus Larsson, Swedish golfer
1971 – Stacy Dragila, American pole vaulter and coach
  1971   – Cammi Granato, American ice hockey player and sportscaster
  1971   – Sheryl Swoopes, American basketball player and coach
1972 – Naftali Bennett, Israeli politician, 13th Prime Minister of Israel
  1972   – Giniel de Villiers, South African racing driver
  1972   – Phil O'Donnell, Scottish footballer (d. 2007)
1973 – Michaela Dorfmeister, Austrian skier
  1973   – Anders Fridén, Swedish singer-songwriter and producer 
  1973   – Bob Sura, American basketball player
1974 – Serge Betsen, Cameroonian-French rugby player
  1974   – Lark Voorhies, American actress and singer
1975 – Ladislav Benýšek, Czech ice hockey player
  1975   – Melanie Blatt, English singer-songwriter and actress 
  1975   – Erika Heynatz, Papua New Guinean-Australian model and actress
1976 – Francie Bellew, Irish footballer
  1976   – Lars Figura, German sprinter
  1976   – Wladimir Klitschko, Ukrainian boxer
  1976   – Rima Wakarua, New Zealand-Italian rugby player
1977 – Natalie Clein, English cellist and educator
  1977   – Andrew Lindsay, Scottish rower
1978 – Gennaro Delvecchio, Italian footballer
1979 – Muriel Hurtis-Houairi, French sprinter
1980 – Kathrine Sørland, Norwegian fashion model and television presenter 
1982 – Danica Patrick, American race car driver
  1982   – Álvaro Saborío, Costa Rican footballer
  1982   – Jenny Slate, American comedian, actress and author
1983 – Mickaël Hanany, French high jumper
1984 – Katharine McPhee, American singer-songwriter and actress
  1984   – Liam Messam, New Zealand rugby player
1985 – Carmen Rasmusen, Canadian-American singer-songwriter and actress
  1985   – Diana Rennik, Estonian figure skater
1986 – Marco Belinelli, Italian basketball player
  1986   – Megan Gibson, American softball player
  1986   – Kyle Lowry, American basketball player
  1986   – Mickey Paea, Australian rugby league player
1987 – Jacob Bagersted, Danish handball player
  1987   – Victor Obinna, Nigerian footballer
  1987   – Nobunari Oda, Japanese figure skater
  1987   – Hyun-jin Ryu, South Korean baseball player
1988 – Big Sean, American rapper, singer and songwriter
  1988   – Ryan Lewis, American music producer
  1988   – Mitchell Watt, Australian long jumper
  1988   – Arthur Zeiler, German rugby player
1989 – Aly Michalka, American singer-songwriter and guitarist
  1989   – Scott Sinclair, English footballer
1990 – Mehmet Ekici, Turkish footballer
  1990   – Alexander Esswein, German footballer
1991 – Scott Malone, English footballer
1992 – Meg Lanning, Australian cricketer
1993 – Jacob Gagan, Australian rugby league player
  1993   – Sam Johnstone, English footballer
1994 – Justine Dufour-Lapointe, Canadian skier

Deaths

Pre-1600
 908 – Li Kening, Chinese general
 940 – Taira no Masakado, Japanese samurai
 990 – Nicodemus of Mammola, Italian monk and saint
1005 – Kenneth III, king of Scotland
1051 – Hugh IV, French nobleman
1189 – Frederick, duke of Bohemia
1223 – Alfonso II, king of Portugal (b. 1185)
1351 – Kō no Moronao, Japanese samurai 
  1351   – Kō no Moroyasu, Japanese samurai
1392 – Hosokawa Yoriyuki, Japanese samurai
1458 – Íñigo López de Mendoza, 1st Marquis of Santillana, Spanish poet and politician (b. 1398)
1558 – Marcos de Niza, French friar and explorer (b. 1495)

1601–1900
1603 – Ikoma Chikamasa, Japanese daimyō (b. 1526)
1609 – Olaus Martini, Swedish archbishop (b. 1557)
  1609   – Isabelle de Limeuil, French noble (b. 1535)
1620 – Johannes Nucius, German composer and theorist (b. 1556)
1625 – Giambattista Marino, Italian poet and author (b. 1569)
1658 – Herman IV, Landgrave of Hesse-Rotenburg, German nobleman (b. 1607)
1677 – Wenceslaus Hollar, Czech-English painter and etcher (b. 1607)
1701 – Jean Regnault de Segrais, French poet and novelist (b. 1624)
1712 – Nehemiah Grew, English anatomist and physiologist (b. 1641)
1732 – Lucy Filippini, Italian teacher and saint (b. 1672)
1736 – Nicholas Hawksmoor, English architect, designed Easton Neston and Christ Church (b. 1661)
1738 – Turlough O'Carolan, Irish harp player and composer (b. 1670)
1801 – Novalis, German poet and author (b. 1772)
1818 – Caspar Wessel, Norwegian-Danish mathematician and cartographer (b. 1745)
1857 – William Colgate, English-American businessman and philanthropist, founded Colgate-Palmolive (b. 1783)
1860 – James Braid, Scottish-English surgeon (b. 1795)
1869 – Edward Bates, American politician and lawyer (b. 1793)
1873 – Wilhelm Marstrand, Danish painter and illustrator (b. 1810)

1901–present
1907 – Ernst von Bergmann, Latvian-German surgeon and academic (b. 1836)
1908 – Durham Stevens, American diplomat (b. 1851)
1914 – Frédéric Mistral, French lexicographer and poet, 1904 Nobel Prize laureate (b. 1830)
1917 – Elizabeth Storrs Mead, American academic (b. 1832)
1918 – Claude Debussy, French composer (b. 1862)
  1918   – Peter Martin, Australian footballer and soldier (b. 1875)
1927 – Marie-Alphonsine Danil Ghattas, Palestinian Roman Catholic nun; later canonized (b. 1843)
1931 – Ganesh Shankar Vidyarthi, Indian journalist and politician (b. 1890)
  1931   – Ida B. Wells, American journalist and activist (b. 1862)
1932 – Harriet Backer, Norwegian painter (b.1845)
1942 – William Carr, American rower (b. 1876)
1951 – Eddie Collins, American baseball player and manager (b. 1887)
1956 – Lou Moore, American race car driver (b. 1904)
  1956   – Robert Newton, English actor (b. 1905)
1958 – Tom Brown, American trombonist (b. 1888)
1964 – Charles Benjamin Howard, Canadian businessman and politician (b. 1885)
1965 – Viola Liuzzo, American civil rights activist (b. 1925)
1969 – Billy Cotton, English singer, drummer, and bandleader (b. 1899)
  1969   – Max Eastman, American poet and activist (b. 1883)
1973 – Jakob Sildnik, Estonian photographer and director (b. 1883)
  1973   – Edward Steichen, Luxembourgian-American photographer, painter, and curator (b. 1879)
1975 – Juan Gaudino, Argentinian race car driver (b. 1893)
  1975   – Faisal of Saudi Arabia, Saudi Arabian king (b. 1906)
  1975   – Deiva Zivarattinam, Indian lawyer and politician (b. 1894)
1976 – Josef Albers, German-American painter and educator (b. 1888)
1976 – Benjamin Miessner, American radio engineer and inventor (b. 1890)
1979 – Robert Madgwick, Australian colonel and academic (b. 1905)
  1979   – Akinoumi Setsuo, Japanese sumo wrestler, the 37th Yokozuna (b. 1914)
1980 – Milton H. Erickson, American psychiatrist and psychologist (b. 1901)
  1980   – Walter Susskind, Czech-English conductor and educator (b. 1913)
1982 – Goodman Ace, American comedian and writer (b. 1899)
1983 – Bob Waterfield, American football player and coach (b. 1920)
1986 – Gloria Blondell, American actress (b. 1910)
1987 – A. W. Mailvaganam, Sri Lankan physicist and academic (b. 1906)
1988 – Robert Joffrey, American dancer, choreographer, and director, co-founded the Joffrey Ballet (b. 1930)
1991 – Marcel Lefebvre, French-Swiss archbishop (b. 1905)
1992 – Nancy Walker, American actress, singer, and director (b. 1922)
1994 – Angelines Fernández, Spanish-Mexican actress (b. 1922)
  1994   – Bernard Kangro, Estonian poet and journalist (b. 1910)
  1994   – Max Petitpierre, Swiss jurist and politician (b. 1899)
1995 – James Samuel Coleman, American sociologist and academic (b. 1926)
  1995   – John Hugenholtz, Dutch engineer (b. 1914)
1998 – Max Green, Australian lawyer (b. 1952)
  1998   – Steven Schiff, American lawyer and politician (b. 1947)
1999 – Cal Ripken, Sr., American baseball player, coach, and manager (b. 1936)
2000 – Helen Martin, American actress (b. 1909)
2001 – Brian Trubshaw, English cricketer and pilot (b. 1924)
2002 – Kenneth Wolstenholme, English journalist and sportscaster (b. 1920)
2005 – Paul Henning, American screenwriter and producer (b. 1911)
2006 – Bob Carlos Clarke, Irish photographer (b. 1950)
  2006   – Rocío Dúrcal, Spanish singer and actress (b. 1944)
  2006   – Richard Fleischer, American film director (b. 1916)
  2006   – Buck Owens, American singer-songwriter and guitarist (b. 1929)
2007 – Andranik Margaryan, Armenian engineer and politician, 10th Prime Minister of Armenia (b. 1951)
2008 – Ben Carnevale, American basketball player and coach (b. 1915)
  2008   – Thierry Gilardi, French journalist and sportscaster (b. 1958)
  2008   – Abby Mann, American screenwriter and producer (b. 1927)
  2008   – Herb Peterson, American businessman, created the McMuffin (b. 1919)
2009 – Johnny Blanchard, American baseball player (b. 1933)
  2009   – Kosuke Koyama, Japanese-American theologian and academic (b. 1929)
  2009   – Dan Seals, American musician (b. 1948)
  2009   – Muhsin Yazıcıoğlu, Turkish politician and member of the Parliament of Turkey (b. 1954)
2012 – Priscilla Buckley, American journalist and author (b. 1921)
  2012   – Hal E. Chester, American actor, director, and producer (b. 1921)
  2012   – John Crosfield, English businessman, founded Crosfield Electronics (b. 1915)
  2012   – Edd Gould, English animator and voice actor, founded Eddsworld (b. 1988)
  2012   – Antonio Tabucchi, Italian author and academic (b. 1943)
2013 – Léonce Bernard, Canadian politician, 26th Lieutenant Governor of Prince Edward Island (b. 1943)
  2013   – Ben Goldfaden, American basketball player and educator (b. 1913)
  2013   – Anthony Lewis, American journalist and academic (b. 1927)
  2013   – Jean Pickering, English runner and long jumper (b. 1929)
  2013   – Jean-Marc Roberts, French author and screenwriter (b. 1954)
  2013   – John F. Wiley, American lieutenant, football player, and coach (b. 1920)
2014 – Lorna Arnold, English historian and author (b. 1915)
  2014   – Hank Lauricella, American football player and politician (b. 1930)
  2014   – Jon Lord, Canadian businessman and politician (b. 1956)
  2014   – Sonny Ruberto, American baseball player, coach, and manager (b. 1946)
  2014   – Jonathan Schell, American journalist and author (b. 1943)
  2014   – Ralph Wilson, American businessman, founded the Buffalo Bills (b. 1918)
2015 – George Fischbeck, American journalist and educator (b. 1922)
2016 – Shannon Bolin, American actress and singer (b. 1917)
2017 – Cuthbert Sebastian, St. Kitts and Nevis politician (b. 1921)
2019 – Barrie Hole, Welsh footballer (b. 1942)
2020 – Floyd Cardoz, Indian-born American chef (b. 1960)
2021 – Beverly Cleary, American author (b. 1916)
2022 – Taylor Hawkins, American drummer and singer (b. 1972)

Holidays and observances
Anniversary of the Arengo and the Feast of the Militants (San Marino)
Christian feast days:
March 25 (Eastern Orthodox liturgics)
Christian Saints' days
Ælfwold II of Sherborne
Barontius and Desiderius
Blessed Marie-Alphonsine Danil Ghattas
Omelyan Kovch (Ukrainian Greek Catholic Church)
Dismas, the "Good Thief"
Humbert of Maroilles
Quirinus of Tegernsee
Commemoration Day for the Victims of Communist Genocide (Latvia)
Cultural Workers Day (Russia)
Empress Menen's Birthday (Rastafari)
EU Talent Day (European Union)
Freedom Day (Belarus)
Independence Day, celebrates the start of Greek War of Independence from the Ottoman Empire, in 1821. (Greece)
International Day of Remembrance of the Victims of Slavery and the Transatlantic Slave Trade (international)
International Day of Solidarity with Detained and Missing Staff Members (United Nations General Assembly)
International Day of the Unborn Child (international)
Maryland Day (Maryland, United States)
Medal of Honor Day (United States)
Mother's Day (Slovenia)
New Year's Day (Lady Day) in England, Wales, Ireland, and some of the future United States and Canada from 1155 through 1751, until the Calendar (New Style) Act 1750 moved it to 1 January (and adopted the Gregorian calendar. (The year 1751 began on 25 March; the year 1752 began on 1 January.)  
NZ Army Day
Quarter day (first of four) in Ireland and England.
Struggle for Human Rights Day (Slovakia)
Tolkien Reading Day
Vårfrudagen or Våffeldagen, "Waffle Day" (Sweden, Norway & Denmark)

References

External links

BBC: On This Day

Historical Events on March 25

Days of the year
March